Caecilia orientalis is a species of caecilian in the family Caeciliidae. It is found in Colombia and Ecuador. Its natural habitats are subtropical or tropical moist lowland forests, subtropical or tropical moist montane forests, rivers, freshwater marshes, intermittent freshwater marshes, pastureland, rural gardens, and heavily degraded former forest.

References

orientalis
Amphibians of Colombia
Amphibians of Ecuador
Amphibians described in 1968
Taxonomy articles created by Polbot